Chromodomain-helicase-DNA-binding protein 5 is an enzyme that in humans is encoded by the CHD5 gene. It is a part of the CHD subfamily of ATP-dependent chromatin remodeling complexes.

References

External links

Further reading